Albert is a masculine given name. It is derived from the Germanic Adalbert and Adelbert, containing the words adal ("noble") and beraht ("bright", compare Robert). It is also less commonly in use as a surname. Feminine forms of the names "Alberta" are declining in use.

Translations
 Albanian: Albert
 Arabic: ألبرت (Albirt), ألبير (Albīr)
 Armenian: Ալբերտ (Albert)
 Azerbaijani: Albert
 Bengali: আলবার্ট ( Albart), (Ālabārṭa)
 Breton: Alberzh
 Catalan: Albert
 Simplified Chinese: 阿尔伯特（Āěrbótè）
 Circassian: Альберт (Albert)
 Croatian: Albert
 Czech: Albert, Vojtěch
 Dutch: Albert, Aalbert, Alberta
 Estonian: Albert
 Finnish: Albert, Alpertti
 French: Albert, 
 Galician: Alberte, Alberto and Albertos
 Georgian: ალბერტი (Alberti)
 German: Albert, Albrecht
 Greek: Αλβέρτος (Alvértos)
 Gujarati: આલ્બર્ટ ( Ālbarṭa)
 Hebrew: אלברט (Albert)
 Hindi: अल्बर्ट ( Albarṭa)
 Icelandic: Albert
 Irish: Ailbe, Ailbhe
 Italian: Alberto
 Japanese: アルバート ( Albārt) (short sound)
 Kannada: ಆಲ್ಬರ್ಟ್ ( Ālbarṭ)
 Khmer: អាល់ប៊ើត (Albeut)
 Korean: 알버트 (Albeoteu)
 Latin: Albertus
 Latvian: Alberts
 Lithuanian: Albertas
 Mongolian: Альберт (Alibyert)
 Nepali: अल्बर्ट (Albarṭa)
 Norwegian: Albert
 Old English: Æthelberht
 Persian: آلبرت
 Polish: Albert, Olbracht
 Portuguese: Alberto
 Punjabi: ਐਲਬਰਟ ( Ailabaraṭa)
 Romanian: Albert
 
 Serbian: Алберт/Albert
 Slovak: Albert
 Slovene: Albert
 Spanish: Alberto
 Swedish: Albert
 Tamil: ஆல்பர்ட் ( Ālparṭ)
 Thai: อัลเบิร์ต ( Xạlbeir̒)
 Turkish: Albert
 Tatar: Альберт (Albert)
 
 Urdu: البرٹ
 Yiddish: אַלבערט

People named Albert

Royalty
 Albert of Austria (disambiguation)
 St. Albert (disambiguation)
 Prince Albert (disambiguation)
 King Albert (disambiguation)
 Albert of Aix (c. 1100), historian of the first crusade
 Albert I of Brandenburg (c. 1100–1170) Margrave of Brandenburg from 1157 to 1170 and duke of Saxony from 1138 to 1142
 Albert of Riga (c. 1165–1229), third Bishop of Riga in Livonia, founder of the city of Riga, one of the principal commanders of Livonian Crusade
 Albert III, Count of Habsburg
 Albert IV, Count of Habsburg
 Albert of Saxony, King of Saxony, one of the principal commanders of Austro-Prussian War, Battle of Gitschin, Battle of Königgrätz, Battle of Sedan and Siege of Paris (1870–71)
 Albert of Brunswick and Lunenburg-Wolfenbüttel (died 1395), as Albert II Prince-Archbishop of Bremen
 Albert II, Margrave of Meissen (c. 1240–1314), the son of Henry III, Margrave of Meißen and Constantia of Austria
 Albert of Sweden (1338–1412), king of Sweden
 Albert, Duke of Saxony (1443–1500), the younger son of Frederick II the Gentle
 Albert VII, Archduke of Austria (1559–1621), ruling Archduke of Austria, one of the principal commanders of Dutch Revolt
 Albert of Mainz (1490–1545), Elector and Archbishop of Mainz from 1514 to 1545 and Archbishop of Magdeburg from 1513 to 1545
 Albert I, Duke of Prussia (1490–1568), Grand Master of the Teutonic Order before converting to Lutheranism and becoming the first duke of Ducal Prussia
 Albert Alcibiades (1522–1557), Margrave of Brandenburg-Kulmbach
 Albert, Prince Consort (1819–1861), Consort of Queen Victoria of the United Kingdom
 Albert, 4th duc de Broglie (1821–1901), French monarchist politician
 Albert, King of Saxony (1828–1873)
 Albert I, Prince of Monaco (1848–1922), the reigning Prince of Monaco from September 10, 1889, to June 26, 1922
 Albert I of Belgium (1875–1934), the third King of the Belgians
 Albert II of Belgium (1934–), the 6th King of the Belgians 
 Albert II, Prince of Monaco (1958–), the head of the House of Grimaldi and the current ruler of the Principality of Monaco
 Christian Albert, Duke of Holstein-Gottorp (1641–1695)
 Albert I, Duke of Saxony (1175–1260), one of the principal commanders of Livonian Crusade
 Albert Alcibiades, Margrave of Brandenburg-Kulmbach, one of the principal commanders of Battle of Sievershausen
 Albert Frederick, Duke of Prussia
 Charles Albert of Sardinia, King of Sardinia, one of the principal commanders of First Italian War of Independence
 Archduke Albert, Duke of Teschen, one of the principal commanders of Battle of Custoza (1866) and Austro-Prussian War
 Albert Casimir, Duke of Teschen, Governor of the Austrian Netherlands, one of the principal commanders of Battle of Jemappes
 Albert the Bear, first margrave of Brandenburg, one of the principal commanders of Second Crusade

Others

A–F
 Albert Abreu (born 1995), Dominican Republic professional baseball player
 Albert "Bert" Addinall (1925–2001), English professional footballer
 Albert Adomakoh (1922–2016), Ghanaian economist, Governor of Bank of Ghana from 1965–1968
 Albert Anae (born 1989), New Zealand-Australian Rugby League player
 Albert "Al" Anderson (born 1950), American songwriter and guitarist
 Albert H. Angstman (1888–1964), Justice of the Montana Supreme Court
 Albert Axelrod (1921–2004), American foil fencer
 Albert Ayler (1936–1970), American jazz saxophonist
 Albert Bandura, psychologist
 Albert Bierstadt (1830–1902), German-American painter
 Albert Bogen (Albert Bógathy; 1882–1961), Austrian Olympic silver medalist saber fencer
 Albert Botran (born 1984), Catalan politician
 Albert Brooks (born 1947), American actor, comedian, writer, and director
 Albert E. Brown, officer in the US Army with rank of Major General, a principal Commander of the Aleutian Islands Campaign
 Albert Ralph Campbell, American Medal of Honor recipient
 Albert Camus (1913–1960), French philosopher and novelist
 Albert Cheesebrough (1935–2020), English footballer
 Albert Collins, American blues singer-guitarist
 Albert Joseph Goblet d'Alviella (1790–1873), officer in the army of the United Kingdom of the Netherlands, politician, and Prime Minister of Belgium
 Albert L. De Alwis Seneviratne, Representative of the Sinhala on the Legislative Council of Ceylon
 Albert Delpy (born 1941), French actor and writer
 Albert DeSalvo (1931–1973), American serial killer
 Albert Dürer, German painter and theorist of the German Renaissance, regarded as one of the greatest painters of the Renaissance era
 Albert Einstein (1879–1955) German-born theoretical physicist, scientist, and philosopher who developed the theory of relativity, one of the two pillars of modern physics, widely regarded as one of the greatest scientists of all time
 Albert Falco (1927–2012), French scuba diving pioneer
 Albert Finney, (1936–2019), English actor
 Albert Fish (1870–1936), American serial killer, child rapist, and cannibal also known as the "Gray Man", the "Werewolf of Wysteria", the "Brooklyn Vampire", the "Moon Maniac", and "The Boogeyman"
 Albert Forster (1902–1952), Nazi German politician and war criminal, Gauleiter of Danzig-West Prussia during the Second World War

G–O
 Albert J. Galen (1876–1936), Justice of the Montana Supreme Court
 Albert Gore, birth name of Al Gore (born 1948), 45th Vice President of the United States
 Albert Gore Sr. (1907–1998), American politician
 Albert Green, birth name of Al Green (born 1946), American R&B musician
 Albert Grossman (1926–1986), American music manager
 Albert "Bert" Haanstra (1916–1997), Dutch film director
 Albert Hammond Jr. (born 1980), American musician
 Albert Hardie Jr. (born 1987), American professional wrestler
 Albert von Hellens (1879–1950), Finnish jurist and politician
 Albert Hemmo (born 1934), Egyptian-born Israeli basketball player
 Albert O. Hirschman, German economist
 Albert Hofmann (1906–2008), Swiss chemist and scientist, first known person to synthesize, ingest, and learn of the psychedelic effects of lysergic acid diethylamide (LSD)
 Albert Huggins (born 1997), American football player
 Albert Johnson, birth name of rapper Prodigy (rapper) of Mobb Deep
 Albert Mussey Johnson (1872–1948), eccentric multimillionaire and builder of Scotty's Castle
 Albert W. Johnson, Republican member of the U.S. House of Representatives from Pennsylvania
 Albert Kallio (1884–1945), Finnish politician
 Albert "Bert" Kesselring (1885–1960), German Generalfeldmarschall of the Luftwaffe during World War II who became one of Nazi Germany's most skillful commanders, one of the principal commanders of Western Front, Allied invasion of Italy, Battle of Britain, Kanalkampf, Adlertag, Battle of Britain Day, The Hardest Day, Battle of France, Operation Achse, Western Allied invasion of Germany, Italian campaign (World War II), Mediterranean and Middle East theatre of World War II, Allied Invasion of Sicily and The Blitz
 Albert "Bertie" King (1912–1981), Jamaican jazz and mento musician
 Albert King (1923–1992, blues singer-guitarist
 Albert Kivikas (1898–1978), Estonian writer and journalist
 Albert “Bert” Kreischer (1972–), American comedian
 Albert Kusnets (1902–1942), Estonian wrestler
 Albert Luthuli (1898–1967), South African teacher, politician, and anti-apartheid activist
 Albert Lefevre (1873–1928), American psychologist
 Albert Lehman, American Olympic medalist lacrosse player
 Albert Lewin (1894–1968), American director, producer, and screenwriter
 Albert L'Ouvrier (1815–1895), French socialist statesman of the French Second Republic
 Albert Margai (born 1987), English basketball player
 Albert Marshall (born 1947), Maltese-Australian author
 Albert Martinez (born 1963), Filipino actor
 Albert Maysles (1926–2015), American documentarian, part of a duo
 Albert Thongchai McIntyre (born 1958), Thai singer
 Albert Millet (1929–2007), French serial killer
 Albert "Bert" Newton (1938–2021), Australian entertainer
 Albert Norak (1928–2015), Estonian Communist politician
 Albert Odulele (born 1964), Nigerian-British pastor, author, and evangelist
 Albert Okwuegbunam (born 1998), American football player
 Albert van Ouwater (c.1415–1475), Dutch painter

P–Z
 Albert Peries (1905–1967), Speaker of the Parliament of Sri Lanka from 1951–1956
 Albert Pujols (born 1980), professional baseball player for the Los Angeles Angels of Anaheim
 Albert Reynolds (1932-2014), ninth Taoiseach of Ireland
 Albert Robertson, Canadian politician from Alberta and the first Leader of the Opposition in the province's history
 Albert "Al" Rosen (1924–2015), American All Star and MVP baseball player
 Albert Rosenfeld (1885–1970), Australian rugby league player
 Albert Sabin (1906–1993), Polish-American medical researcher who developed an oral polio vaccine; President of the Weizmann Institute of Science
 Albert Sauer (1898–1945), German Nazi SS officer and concentration camp commandant of Mauthausen-Gusen and Kaiserwald concentration camps
 Albert Scanlon (1935–2009), English footballer
 Albert E. Schwab (1920–1945), American Marine, awarded Medal of Honor
 Albert Schwartz (swimmer) (1908–1986), American swimmer
 Albert Sharpe (1885–1970), Irish actor
 Albert Speer (1905–1981), Minister of Armaments and War Production for the Third Reich
 Albert D. Sturtevant (1894–1918), officer in the US Navy during World War I
 Albert Schweitzer (1875–1965), German/French theologian, organist, philosopher, physician, and medical missionary
 Albert Taar (born 1990), Estonian footballer
 Albert Uderzo (1927–2020), French comic book artist
 Albert Üksip (1886–1966), Estonian botanist
 Albert Vallci (born 1995), Austrian footballer
 Albert Vanloo (1846–1920), Belgian librettist and playwright
 Albert Van Coile (1900–1927), Belgian footballer
 Albert Vanhoye (1923–2021), French priest, Jesuit biblical scholar
 Albert Vete (born 1993), Tonga rugby footballer
 Albert Von Tilzer (1878–1956), American songwriter
 Albert Warner (1884–1967), American cartoonist and one of the founders of Warner Bros.
 Albert J. Weber (1859–1925), Associate Justice and Chief Justice of the Utah Supreme Court
 Albert Coady Wedemeyer (1896–1989), US Army commander who served in Asia during World War II, a principal commander of Operation Beleaguer
 Albert Buckman Wharton Jr. (a.k.a. Buster Wharton) (1909–1963), American rancher and polo player
 Albert Lawrence Williams Jr. (born 1934), known as A. L. Williams, retired football coach
 Albert "Al" Witcher (born 1936), American football player
 Albert Wolff (sculptor) (1814–1892), German sculptor and medallist
 Albert Wolff (fencer) (1906–1989), French-born American Olympic fencer
 Albert "Bertie" Wright (1871–1960), English of the silent era
 Albert Zerkowitz (1905–1964) entomologist
 Albert Zwaveling (born 1927), Dutch surgeon

Fictional characters
 Albert, supporting character in Josie (later Josie and the Pussycats)
 Albert Arkwright, a character in British sitcom Open All Hours
 Albert Chapman, character of the video game Killer7
 Albert Heinrich, a.k.a. Cyborg 004, a character in the manga series Cyborg 009
 "Fat" Albert Jackson, lead character in the animated series Fat Albert and the Cosby Kids
 Albert Johnson, character in the video game Medievil 2
 Albert Manning, a character in Degrassi: The Next Generation
 Albert Markovski, an environmentalist character in I Heart Huckabees
 Albert James Moriarty, a main character of the manga Moriarty the Patriot
 Albert Runcorn, a Ministry of Magic investigator in Harry Potter and the Deathly Hallows – Part 1
 Albert Steptoe, one of the lead characters in British sitcom Steptoe and Son
 Albert Tatlock, a character in British soap opera Coronation Street
 Albert Trotter, a character in British sitcom Only Fools and Horses
 Albert Wesker, a villain and high ranking commander of Umbrella Corps in the "Resident Evil" franchise
 Albert W. Wily, a villain in the video game series Mega Man

See also
 Albertus (given name)
 Albertet, an Occitan diminutive of Albert
 Albrecht
 
 Elbert (disambiguation)
 Albert I (disambiguation)
 Albert II (disambiguation)
 Albert III (disambiguation)
 Albert IV (disambiguation)
 Albie (given name)
 Alby (disambiguation)

References

Masculine given names
Circassian masculine given names
Croatian masculine given names
Czech masculine given names
Danish masculine given names
Dutch masculine given names
English masculine given names
Estonian masculine given names
French masculine given names
Finnish masculine given names
German masculine given names
Hungarian masculine given names
Icelandic masculine given names
Norwegian masculine given names
Polish masculine given names
Romanian masculine given names
Russian masculine given names
Slovak masculine given names
Slovene masculine given names
Swedish masculine given names